Fritz Hippler (17 August 1909 – 22 May 2002) was a German filmmaker who ran the film department in the Propaganda Ministry of Nazi Germany, under Joseph Goebbels. He is best known as the director of the propaganda film Der Ewige Jude (The Eternal Jew).

Early life and education
Hippler was born and brought up in Berlin as the son of a petty official. His father died in 1918 in the First World War in France. Hippler resented the Treaty of Versailles and its associated regulations, such as the assignment of the Danzig Corridor, the occupation of the Rhineland and the disarmament of Germany as unjustified humiliation, and rejected the Weimar democracy.

In 1925 when he was 17, Hippler joined the Nazi party NSDAP.

In 1927, Hippler became a member of the NSD Studentbund - the National Socialist German Students' League. Later he studied law in Heidelberg and Berlin. He was a member of the  dueling society in Heidelberg and the Arminia dueling society in Berlin. In 1932 he became NSDAP district speaker. In 1933 he was appointed the district and high school group leader for Berlin-Brandenburg in the National Socialist German Students' League.

Hippler was a supporter of expressionism. As the leader of the National Socialist German Students' League of Berlin he organised an exhibition in Humboldt University of Berlin for expressionist painters, for which he was vehemently attacked by the Nazi ideologist Alfred Rosenberg.

In 1932, Hippler was expelled from the University of Berlin for participating in violent Nazi rallies. On 19 April 1933, the new National Socialist Education Minister Bernhard Rust repealed any disciplinary actions against students associated with the NSDAP, thus reinstating Hippler.

On 22 May 1933, he gave a speech initiating a march from the student house in the Oranienburger Straße to Opera Square with books which were then burned.

In June 1933 Hippler participated in a violent rally opposite the stock exchange, against Alfred Hugenberg then minister of finance and still Hitler's rival, calling Hitler to disavow him and remove him from power.

Hippler was later involved in a dispute over the direction of arts policy. He was satisfied with the anti-Jewish orientation of the arts policy and the consequent banishment of that art from museums and art dealers who had been created by people of Jewish faith. However,  in July 1933 at a rally of the National Socialist Student League in the lecture hall of the Berlin University, he criticised the harsh action of some Nazi circles against the German modern artists like Emile Nolde and Barlach, the artists group Die Brücke, which was propagated by elements of the Nazi leadership as part of efforts against the Degenerate Art. Although Goebbels was a lover of Nolde, this direction after a word of argument was in favour of the more radical of Hitler's National Socialists, whose spokesman was Alfred Rosenberg and his Combat League for German Culture.

Fritz Hippler earned his PhD in 1934 at the Heidelberg University with Arnold Bergstraesser and a dissertation titled "State and Society in the Thinking of John Stuart Mill, Karl Marx, and Paul de Lagarde. A contribution to the sociological thinking of the present time".

Career in film production

After receiving his doctorate in 1934, Hippler became a lecturer at the German University of Policy in Berlin. From 1936 he worked as assistant to Hans Weidemann working on the production of German newsreels, directed in the Reich Ministry for Public Enlightenment and Propaganda. Here he learned the production of documentaries. In January 1939, he took over Weidemann's position. In August 1939, Goebbels promoted Hippler again. He appointed the 29-year-old Hippler to head the film department at the Reich Ministry for Public Enlightenment and Propaganda RMVP. In February 1942, he appointed him to the kingdom of film directors. With these two functions Hippler was one of the most important politicians of the film "Third Reich" after Goebbels. In October 1942, he was Director in the RMVP. His task was control, supervision and direction of German filmmaking.

In 1938, Hippler was appointed to the rank of SS Hauptsturmführer. According to Veit Harlan, Hippler loved to wear his SS uniform.

In his ministerial functions, Hippler continued to produce films. In 1939-40 he was responsible for the propaganda film The campaign in Poland. In 1940, he was responsible for the management and design of the feature-length documentary film The Eternal Jew—according to Courtade, History of Film in the Third Reich, "the vilest anti-Semitic Nazi films." The film historian Frank Noack assessed The Eternal Jew as "probably the most radical inflammatory film of all time". An article written by Hippler in the magazine "The film" about its creation marked Jews as "parasites of national degeneracy." He deliberately filmed conditions within the Warsaw Ghetto to show the starving inhabitants, conditions designed by the Germans to increase the death rate. The film served as a preparation and agreement of the population in the coming holocaust and was mainly used for training of police and SS troops. In the same year, Hippler received from Hitler a secret special endowment of 60,000 Reichsmarks in recognition of his services to the Reich.

In addition to The Eternal Jew Hippler also directed the 1940 propaganda documentary Feldzug in Polen about the Third Reich's invasion and occupation of Poland in 1939, and Die Frontschau (The Frontshow), a series of shorts shown to soldiers before being shipped to the Eastern Front.

In 1942, Hippler published a book about film theory titled Betrachtungen zum Filmschaffen (i.e., Contemplations on Filmmaking), which included a preface by Emil Jannings.

By 1943, he was promoted to Obersturmbannführer.

Conflict with Goebbels
Goebbels could usually count on his young people. Nevertheless, he frequently criticized their shortcomings. As early as 1939, he recorded in his diaries that Hippler was intelligent but cheeky and totally contradictory. He also stated that Hippler was immature. Goebbels complained repeatedly about the disorganisation of the film department. Hippler suffered apparently with alcohol addiction. Goebbels finally discharged Hippler in June 1943 due to "mishaps, alcoholism, and family problems”, although Hippler claimed in his memoirs that he was removed due to his choice of Erich Kaestner for the screenplay of the film Münchhausen even though several of Kaestner's books and plays had been banned by the Nazis in 1933.

After his dismissal, Hippler was accused of falsely denying his partial Jewish descent and demoted from his SS rank. Hippler was sent to an infantry replacement battalion of the country, according to Strauss and underwent mountain infantry training. Then he was again released from active duty and used until February 1945 as a front cameraman in order to produce material for newsreels. On 3 May 1945, he flew into Hamburg as a British prisoner of war.

Postwar

After the end of the Second World War, Hippler was interned and sentenced to two years in prison. He was able to stage a comeback after his release. He was interviewed in the Bill Moyers CBS Cable documentary A Walk Through the 20th Century in 1982.

Hippler died on 22 May 2002, at the age of 92.

Filmography
Wort und Tat Words and Deeds. A documentary film 1938, director
Der Westwall The Western Wall 1939, director
Feldzug in Polen Campaign in Poland 1939–40, director
Der ewige Jude (The Eternal Jew) "Film contribution to the problem of world Jewry" (1940, directed, co-ordination)
Several short film revues for the Die Frontschau (The Front Show) (1941, director)
Sieg im Westen (Victory in the West) (1941, producer), a film about the campaign against France and the Benelux countries.
Der Fuhrer und Sein Volk (1942, director)
Orient Express (1944, producer)
Interview with Hippler (1981, A Walk Through the 20th Century)

Books
"Betrachtungen zum Filmschaffen", 2nd Ed, Berlin (Hesse's Publishing) 1942
"Die Verstrickung. Einstellungen und Rückblenden von Fritz Hippler ehemaliger Reichsfilmintendant unter Josef Goebbels", Düsseldorf revised second Edition 1982
"Meinungsdressur?. Ein heiter-kritisches Fernsehtagebuch", Mountain / Lake Starnberg 1985
"Verbrecher Mensch? Die Beobachtungen des Historikers Johannes Scherr", Mountain / Lake Starnberg 1987
"Schopenhauer heute. Denkanstöße und Kostproben", Mountain / Lake Starnberg (Türmer-Verlag) 1988
"Korrekturen: Zeitgeschichtliche Spurensuche, einmal anders", Mountain / Lake Starnberg ( Mountain Publishing Company ) 1995
"Einspruch Euer Ehren: Den Zeitgeist an den Pranger. Narreteien aus der deutschen Provinz", Mountain / Lake Starnberg (Mountain Publishing Company) 1999

Further reading
Hans-Jürgen Brandt: Nazi documentary film theory and practice: Hippler, Noldan, Junghans . Tuebingen (Niemeyer) 1987, 
Felix Moeller: The Film Minister. Goebbels and the Cinema in the Third Reich. With a foreword by Volker Schlondorff. Translated from the Deutsch by Michael Robinson. Stuttgart-London 2000, 
Roel Vande Winkel: Nazi Germany's Fritz Hippler (1909–2002). In: Historical Journal of Film, Radio and Television, Vol 23, No. 2, 2003, 91-99. ISSN 1465-3451
Silver bullet movie: eyewitness report: State Film Intendant Fritz Hippler . Bochum 2007, time travel-Verlag (DVD Documentary),

References

External links

"Film As a Weapon", a Hippler essay from a Nazi magazine translated into English
an interview with Hippler
Joseph Goebbels und der Deutsche Film DOKU (BBC 1993, YouTube)

1909 births
2002 deaths
Antisemitism in Germany
German documentary film directors
Film people from Berlin
Nazi propagandists
Film theorists
People from the Province of Brandenburg
Propaganda film directors